Clube Atlético Monte Alegre, commonly known as Monte Alegre, was a Brazilian football club based in Telêmaco Borba, Paraná state. They won the Campeonato Paranaense once.

History
The club was founded on May 1, 1946. Monte Alegre won the Campeonato Paranaense in 1955. The club eventually closed its football department.

Achievements

 Campeonato Paranaense:
 Winners (1): 1955

Stadium
Clube Atlético Monte Alegre played their home games at Estádio Horácio Klabin. The stadium had a maximum capacity of 5,000 people.

References

Association football clubs established in 1946
Defunct football clubs in Paraná (state)
Telêmaco Borba
1946 establishments in Brazil
Klabin